The 2023 New Hampshire Wildcats football team will represent the University of New Hampshire as a member of the Colonial Athletic Association (CAA) in the 2023 NCAA Division I FCS football season. The Wildcats are led by second-year head coach Ricky Santos and play their home games at Wildcat Stadium in Durham, New Hampshire.

Previous season

The Wildcats finished the 2022 season with an overall record of 9–4, 7–1 CAA play to finish in a tie for first place. They lost 35–19 to Holy Cross in the 
NCAA Division I Second Round

Schedule

References

New Hampshire
New Hampshire Wildcats football seasons
New Hampshire Wildcats football